Wings of Love is a 1976 album by the Tempations.

Wings of Love may also refer to:

Albums
 Wings of Love (Fish Leong album), 2004
 Wings of Love (Nova album), 1977
 Wings of Love, by Olsen Brothers, 2000
 Wings of Love, by Shuggie Otis, 2013

Songs
 "Wings of Love" (Liv song). 2016
 "Wings of Love", by Andy Taylor from the American Anthem film soundtrack
 "Wings of Love", by April Wine from The Whole World's Goin' Crazy
 "Wings of Love", by Arisa Mizuki from Arisa II: Shake Your Body for Me
 "Wings of Love", by Carole King from Welcome Home
 "Wings of Love", by Level 42 from The Early Tapes
 "Wings of Love", by Nino Tempo & April Stevens
 "Wings of Love", by Nirvana from The Story of Simon Simopath
 "Wings of Love", by Reset
 "Wings of Love", by Scoop
 "Wings of Love", by Žagar

Other uses
 Wings of Love (Pearson), a c. 1972 painting by Stephen Pearson
 Bana Sevmeyi Anlat (English: Wings of Love), a Turkish television series
 "Wings of Love", a 1929–1930 series of Hearst Sunday newspaper magazine covers by Russell Patterson
 Wings of Love Foundation, a non-profit organization operated by Monkey Jungle, Miami, Florida, US

See also
 On the Wings of Love (disambiguation)